The Dentist Act, 1948 is an Indian legislation which regulates the profession of  dentistry.

Amendments
Dentist (Amendment) Bill, 2016 was passed by Rajya Sabha on 1 August 2016 approving the applicability of NEET.

References

Indian legislation
Dentistry in India
1948 in law
1948 in India